Khadak is a 2022 Indian Kannada-language crime action film, directed by TN Nagesh and produced by S Valli & Singapura Siddaramaya. It was produced under the banner of Nandini Combines. The film features Dharma Keerthiraj, Anusha Rai, and Kabir Duhan Singh. The score and soundtrack for the movie were made by M.N. Krupakar, the cinematography is done by Shankar Shanmugam, and the editing is done by Sanjeev Reddy.

Plot 
Dharma is an unselfish person who strives for the welfare of society by helping the poor and fighting injustice. He is the son of Major Suryakanth, who was assassinated in front of his son despite denying selling military secrets. Dharma becomes a police officer as an adult to exact revenge on those who killed his parents.

On the other hand, Dharma enjoys life with her group of friends and loves Priya (Anusha Rai). He has been praised by the public for coming to the aid of an elderly man who has acquired land from MLAs and helped to build Kannada school.

Cast
 Dharma Keerthiraj as Dharma 
 Anusha Rai as Priya
 Kabir Duhan Singh 
 Suman Talwar

Production 
Darshan began the movie's production in 2019.

Soundtrack

The soundtrack is composed by M.N. Krupakar.

Reception 
Vinay Lokesh of The Times of India rated the film 2.5/5 stars and wrote "A revenge drama that falls flat ".

References

External links 
 

2022 films
2022 crime action films
Indian crime action films
2020s Kannada-language films